Simon Murray may refer to:

Simon Murray (businessman) (born 1940), British businessman and adventurer
Simon Murray (cricketer) (born 1963), English cricketer
Simon Murray (barrister) (born 1974), British barrister and minister
Simon Murray (footballer) (born 1992), Scottish footballer